Bernard Mullins Campbell, also known as Bérnal Mullins,  (born December 5, 1973 in Cartago, Costa Rica) is a Costa Rican former football  striker.

Club career
Nicknamed La Dinamita, Mullins started his career with Cartaginés before joining Alajuelense in 1995 and returning to Cartaginés two years later. He had a stint on loan in Guatemalan football with USAC in 1999 amid controversy about a fee the Guatemalans had to pay Cartaginés for the loan. In January 2000, he returned to Costa Rica to play for Herediano.

In May 2005, Mullins moved abroad to play for Salvadoran outfit FAS, with whom he won the 2005 league title a month later.

Mullins denied reports of a possible retirement in November 2008, citing he would love to play on for Cartaginés. He eventually retired in 2008 and was given a farewell match in October 2009. In 2007, he was joint Costa Rican record holder in having served seven different Costa Rican clubs.

International career
Mullins made his debut for Costa Rica in a November 1997 FIFA World Cup qualification match against Canada and earned a total of 3 caps, scoring no goals. He represented his country in 1 FIFA World Cup qualification match and played at the 1998 CONCACAF Gold Cup.

His final international was a February 1998 CONCACAF Gold Cup match against the United States.

Personal Achievement
Mullins is rated in the top 20 goalscorers in the first division of Costa Rica with 110 goals.

Managerial career
After retiring as a player, Mullins became assistant coach at Cartaginés.

References

External links

 Profile - CD FAS 

1973 births
Living people
People from Cartago Province
Association football forwards
Costa Rican footballers
Costa Rica international footballers
C.S. Herediano footballers
Universidad de San Carlos players
L.D. Alajuelense footballers
C.S. Cartaginés players
Municipal Liberia footballers
A.D. Carmelita footballers
C.D. FAS footballers
C.F. Universidad de Costa Rica footballers
Costa Rican expatriate footballers
Liga FPD players
Expatriate footballers in Guatemala
Expatriate footballers in El Salvador
Costa Rican expatriate sportspeople in El Salvador
Costa Rican expatriate sportspeople in Guatemala
1998 CONCACAF Gold Cup players